"Hip-Hop" is a song by American hip hop duo Dead Prez, released on March 30, 1999 as a single from their debut studio album Let's Get Free (2000). Produced by production group Hedrush and Dead Prez, it is the duo's best-known song.

Composition and lyrics
The production of the song features a "warped, wobbly" bassline. Lyrically, Dead Prez criticizes the capitalist functions of the music industry and its exploitation of black people ("These record labels slang our tapes like dope / You can be next in line and signed and still be writing rhymes and broke"), and encourages the idea of using hip hop music as a means to promote social change. In the first verse, M-1 promotes staying true to oneself as a rapper, and Stic.man echoes the message of the song in his final lines.

Critical reception
The song received positive reviews from music critics. Andy Capper of NME described it as "A truly remarkable, inventive track - with its crazy, twisting boa constrictor bassline and blazing, call-to-arms chorus - it's a fierce declaration of war on hip-hop capitalists and an urgent reminder for rappers and fans alike to consider the bigger picture, asking them: 'Would you rather have a Lexus or justice?'" Billboard ranked it as one of the greatest songs of 1999.

Remix
A remix of the song titled "It's Bigger Than Hip-Hop" appears on Let's Get Free. This version features Tahir (of Hedrush) and The People's Army, and was produced by Kanye West and Dead Prez.

In popular culture
The instrumental of the song served as the opening music for Chappelle's Show.

Charts

"Hip-Hop"

"It's Bigger Than Hip-Hop"

References

1999 singles
1999 songs
American hip hop songs
Loud Records singles